Maksim Viktorovich Averin (26 November 1975 ) is a Russian actor who works in theater, film and television. He is best known for starring in the long running medical drama television series Sklifosovsky. He is also a television director and presenter. He was named an Honored Artist of the Russian Federation in 2014.

Biography 
Maksim Averin was born in Moscow, Russian SFSR, Soviet Union. His father worked at the Mosfilm as a painter-decorator. Averin made his debut on the silver screen at the age of six. Once in second grade Maksim refused to write a math test and said that he did not need it at drama school.

In 1997 he graduated with honors from Boris Shchukin Theatre Institute, at the Vakhtangov State Academic Theater. He played in the Satyricon Theatre for eighteen years, In Satyricon  he played in  Macbeth,  Richard III,  King Lear, Lion in Winter,  Hamlet,  Hedda Gabler  and others.

January 7, 2023, against the backdrop of 2022 Russian invasion of Ukraine, was included in the sanctions list of Ukraine.

Career 
Maksim Averin’s film career began in 1999 with the role of Korabelnikov in the comedy Love is Evil directed by Vladimir Zaykin. After this work, the actor even was called  Russian Jim Carrey.
He won the TEFI Award for Best Actor on TV in 2011.

Since 2014 Averin host of the show Three Chords on Channel One Russia.

Filmography

References

External links

 Official website
 
 

1975 births
Living people
Russian male film actors
Russian male stage actors
Russian male television actors
Male actors from Moscow
21st-century Russian male actors
20th-century Russian male actors
Russian directors
Honored Artists of the Russian Federation
Russian male voice actors
Russian television presenters